Thatayaone Mothuba (born 5 May 1978) is a Botswanan footballer who plays as a defender for Nico United since 2003. Mothuba was first called up to the Botswana national football team in 2001, and won two caps for his country in 2002.

Career
Thatayone Mothuba was born on 5 May 1978. He played for Botswana under 17,20,23, senior national team and was part of the team that won the Botswana 4 nation tournament when he scored the winning goal against Namibia. A very strong defender with aerial power.
He won championships with the former team Notwane football club. He was part of the team that played a goalless draw in a COSAFA castle cup in Gaborone national stadium. Currently he is an assistant coach at Nico United in Selebi Phikwe, he worked with the likes of former Zimbabwean winger Madinda Ndlovu, Luke Masumera, Paul Gundani.

External links

1978 births
Living people
People from Gaborone
Association football defenders
Botswana footballers
Nico United players
Botswana international footballers
Notwane F.C. players